Land of Cockayne is the tenth studio album by the jazz rock band Soft Machine, released in 1981. By this point, the band had lost all of its original members. The title refers to the medieval land of plenty. It would be the last album released under the Soft Machine name until Hidden Details in 2018.

Overview
The album came about as the result of a project in which Karl Jenkins and John Marshall had been involved featuring top session musicians. The ad hoc band, Rollercoaster, had recently recorded the Stevie Wonder tribute album Wonderin' (1980) and decided to record another album together. Many of the musicians included on the Cockayne album would make up Soft Machine's final live line-up which played a six-night residency at Ronnie Scott's in 1984. This is the only Soft Machine album to feature a string section.

Track listing

All compositions by Karl Jenkins.

Side one

"Over 'n' Above" – 7:24 
"Lotus Groves" – 4:57
"Isle of the Blessed" – 1:56 
"Panoramania" – 7:07
"Behind the Crystal Curtain" – 0:53

Side two

"Palace of Glass" – 3:22
"Hot-Biscuit Slim" – 7:27 
"(Black) Velvet Mountain" – 5:10 
"Sly Monkey" – 5:00
"A Lot of What You Fancy..." – 0:35

Personnel
Soft Machine
 Karl Jenkins – piano, Minimoog, Yamaha CS-80, Synclavier, arranger, conductor
 John Marshall – drums, percussion
Additional musicians
 Allan Holdsworth – lead guitar
 Ray Warleigh – alto saxophone, bass flute
 Dick Morrissey – tenor saxophone
 Alan Parker – rhythm guitar
 John Taylor – electric piano
 Jack Bruce – bass
 Stu Calver – vocals, backing vocals
 John Perry – vocals, backing vocals
 Tony Rivers – vocals, backing vocals
Production

 Mike Thorne – production
 Roy Ellsworth – artwork
 Bill Harman – orchestra leader

References

External links
 Soft Machine - Land of Cockayne (1981) album rating, user reviews, credits & releases at AllMusic
 Soft Machine - Land of Cockayne (1981) album releases & credits at Discogs
 Soft Machine - Land of Cockayne (1981) album to be listened on Spotify
 Soft Machine - Land of Cockayne (1981) album to be listened on YouTube

Soft Machine albums
1981 albums
EMI Records albums
Albums produced by Mike Thorne